Gamadiel Adrián García Sánchez (born 20 July 1979) is a Chilean former professional footballer who played as an attacking midfielder.

Club career
He debuted as professional footballer at Chilean powerhouse Universidad de Chile in 1998, in where García won his first two titles in his career, the same year: the league title and the Copa Chile. The next season, he was loaned to Coquimbo Unido for one season, he also was the top-scorer at the team of Coquimbo alongside Pascual de Gregorio. In January 2003, he moved to Mexico for play at Necaxa, in where he scored three goals in 48 appearances, and two years later, García signed a contract with Venezuelan Primera División giants Caracas, then playing the next seasons at Once Caldas and Maracaibo, and in 2006, he returned to his country for play his old club Coquimbo Unido.

In December 2006, García joined to Greek Super League side Skoda Xanthi for an undisclosed fee, returning the next season to Chile for play in Huachipato, in where he had successful spell, scoring 24 goals in 88 appearances at the team of Talcahuano. Four years later, he signed a contract with Deportes La Serena and the next season, thanks to his good campaign, García joined Deportivo Táchira, team that disputed the 2012 Copa Libertadores. In June, he returned to Chile and was signed by Primera División club Audax Italiano.

International career
García was part of the Chilean U-20 squad that played the 1999 South American Youth Championship made in Argentina. Three years later, he debuted for the adult squad against Turkey in a friendly game, on 17 April 2002, being this his only international appearance, despite of his another game disputed with Chile against Aragon in 2006, that was considered a non-official FIFA match.

Post-retirement
Once he retired from football, he was elected for a second term in 2020.

Honours

Club
Universidad de Chile
 Chilean Primera División (1): 1998
 Copa Chile (1): 1998

Once Caldas
 Recopa Sudamericana (1): Runner-up 2005

Individual
 Copa Chile (1): 2008–09 Top-scorer

References

External links
 
 Gamadiel García at Football Lineups
 
 
 

1979 births
Living people
Footballers from Santiago
Chilean footballers
Chilean expatriate footballers
Chile under-20 international footballers
Chile international footballers
Universidad de Chile footballers
Coquimbo Unido footballers
Club Necaxa footballers
Caracas FC players
Once Caldas footballers
UA Maracaibo players
Xanthi F.C. players
C.D. Huachipato footballers
Deportes La Serena footballers
Deportivo Táchira F.C. players
Audax Italiano footballers
Deportes Concepción (Chile) footballers
Deportes Colchagua footballers
Municipal La Pintana footballers
Chilean Primera División players
Liga MX players
Venezuelan Primera División players
Categoría Primera A players
Super League Greece players
Primera B de Chile players
Segunda División Profesional de Chile players
Chilean expatriate sportspeople in Mexico
Chilean expatriate sportspeople in Venezuela
Chilean expatriate sportspeople in Colombia
Chilean expatriate sportspeople in Greece
Expatriate footballers in Mexico
Expatriate footballers in Venezuela
Expatriate footballers in Colombia
Expatriate footballers in Greece
Association football midfielders